Split city derby or Derby of St. Duje (town's patron saint) is the name given to matches between Hajduk and RNK, two clubs from the Adriatic city of Split. The teams are supported by their fanbases called Hajduk's Torcida and Split's Crveni đavoli. Games are played on two nearby stadiums, Poljud and Park Mladeži.

History
Derby between Hajduk and Split dates back to the days of Kingdom of Yugoslavia in the early 1920s after clubs were founded only one year apart. The first match between the two was an exhibition on 16 Mar 1919 between Hajduk and Anarh, ending in 11-0 Hajduk win. While today's RNK Split was in those times often dissolved, renamed or joined with other Split teams (over the years team was called Anarh, JNSK Jug, Split ŠK, Borac BŠK, HAŠK Split, Vicko Krstulović, Arsenal) Hajduk maintained its name and home ground, providing a field for their matches until Park mladeži was built in 1955. Teams regularly met during this period, playing friendly games and Split Championship. Between 1920 and 1941, clubs played 24 official and close to 50 friendly matches, with Hajduk winning almost all of them.

Following the end of World War II, both clubs were dissolved and joined anti-fascist movements. Split players were also active soldiers during Spanish Civil War. After the war ended, both were reactivated, and continued their tradition which now spans to over 100 friendly games. First official league meeting came after Split qualified for their first league appearance in 1957–58 season. Split won a home game 2-0, but was eventually eliminated, only to return three years later for one more season. Their managers at time were one of Hajduk's greats Luka Kaliterna and Frane Matošić. Before Yugoslavia fell apart teams met in Yugoslav Cup couple of times, with Hajduk winning every game and achieving far memorable results.

Since Croatian independence, Hajduk joined Croatia’s top tier, while Split played lower divisions. Teams met in 1992–93 Croatian Cup in a surprising 3-0 Split win at Poljud, only to see Hajduk winning 2nd game 4-0 and go to the next round. For the next 18 years, only friendlies were occasionally played before Split earned their first elite division promotion for 2010–11 season. In the last few years, Hajduk went through financial and organisational changes, and with Split playing their best football in recent history, derbies became more leveled than ever before. Today, Split is going through a financial crisis while Hajduk became more stabilised but in the derbies, they are still equally matched.

Results
The most recent derby was played on 31 July 2016 in Park Mladeži, in the 29th round of the 2016–17 Prva HNL season. It ended in a 1–0 Hajduk's win, with Franck Ohandza's only scorer.

Last updated on 26 April 2017

Key

1920–1941

Note: Home team's score always shown first

1945–1992

Note: Home team's score always shown first

1992–

Note: Home team's score always shown first

Player and manager records

Top scorers 1919–1992

16 goals
 Leo Lemešić (Hajduk)

15 goals
 Ljubomir Benčić (Hajduk)
 Mirko Bonačić (Hajduk)

9 goals
 Vladimir Kragić (Hajduk)
  Frane Matošić (Hajduk)

8 goals
 Vinko Radić (Hajduk)

5 goals
 Šime Poduje (Hajduk)
 Janko Rodin (Hajduk)

Top scorers 1992–
Updated up to the last derby played on 26 April 2017

5 goals
 Ante Erceg (Split, Hajduk)

3 goals
 Mijo Caktaš (Hajduk)
 Mario Pašalić (Hajduk)
 Ivan Pešić (Split)

2 goals
 Srđan Andrić (Hajduk)
 Sokol Cikalleshi (Split)
 Tomislav Erceg (Hajduk)
 Anton Maglica (Hajduk)
 Franck Ohandza (Hajduk)
 Tino-Sven Sušić (Hajduk)
 Sandro Ugrina (Split)
 Nikola Vlašić (Hajduk)
 Ante Vukušić (Hajduk)

Players who have scored in Split city derby for both clubs
 Ante Erceg

Players who have played for both clubs (senior career)

 Mate Bilić
 Duje Čop
 Zvonimir Deranja
 Ante Erceg
 Dalibor Filipović
 Tomislav Glumac
 Juraj Grizelj
 Mirko Hrgović
 Janko Janković
 Frane Lojić
 Filip Marčić
 Artem Milevskyi
 Goran Milović
 Srđan Mladinić
 Jure Obšivač
 Mirko Oremuš
 Ivan Pešić
 Ivica Pirić
 Nenad Pralija
 Ivan Radeljić
 Predrag Šimić
 Ivan Tomičić
 Ivan Anton Vasilj
 Josip Vuković

Managers who have worked at both clubs
 Lenko Grčić
 Ivan Katalinić
 Frane Matošić
 Jozo Matošić
 Ozren Nedoklan
 Stanko Poklepović
 Ivo Radovniković
 Zoran Vulić

Head-to-head league results

The table lists the place each team took in each of the seasons.

See also
Eternal derby
Adriatic derby
Dalmatian derby (Hajduk Split vs Šibenik)
Dinamo–Rijeka derby

References

External links

HNK Hajduk Split
RNK Split
Football derbies in Croatia